Ramnarine Chattergoon (born April 30, 1982) is a former Guyanese cricketer who played seven List A matches for the Combined Campuses and Colleges cricket team in 2007 and 2008. Chattergoon was born in Corentyne, Berbice, Guyana.

References

External links

Guyanese cricketers
Combined Campuses and Colleges cricketers
Living people
1982 births